Live in Japan can refer to one of the following albums or videos:

Albums
Live in Japan (21st Century Schizoid Band album)
Live in Japan (22-20s album)
Live in Japan (B.B. King album)
Live in Japan (Beck, Bogert & Appice album)
Live in Japan (The Carpenters album)
Live in Japan (Chicago album)
Live in Japan (The Country Gentlemen album)
Live in Japan (Deep Purple album)
Live in Japan (Do As Infinity album)
Live in Japan (Duke Jordan album)
Live in Japan (Fred Frith album)
Live in Japan (George Harrison album)
Live in Japan (Glen Campbell album)
Live in Japan (Hot Tuna album)
Live in Japan (Leon Russell album)
Live in Japan (Il Divo album)
Live in Japan (John Coltrane album)
Live in Japan (Material album)
Live in Japan (New Riders of the Purple Sage album)
Live in Japan (Primal Scream album)
Live in Japan (Riot album)
Live in Japan (Rockapella album)
Live in Japan (Rodrigo y Gabriela album)
Live in Japan (The Runaways album)
Live in Japan (Sarah Vaughan album)
Live in Japan (Sham 69 album)
Live in Japan (Shirley Bassey album)
Live in Japan (Simian Mobile Disco album)
Live in Japan (Slapp Happy album)
Live in Japan (Stacie Orrico album)
Live in Japan (Vader album)
Live in Japan (The Work album)
Live in Japan, a 1974 album by Wilson Pickett
Live in Japan, a 1990 album by Night Ranger
Live in Japan, a 2011 album by former Fleetwood Mac member Bob Welch
Live in Japan '78 (Count Basie album)
Live in Japan: Spring Tour 1973, a Donovan album
Rockin' Every Night – Live in Japan, a Gary Moore album
Live in Japan 2004, an Incubus album
EleKtrik: Live in Japan, a King Crimson album
Rituals: Live in Japan, a Painkiller album
Destroy All Monsters/Live in Japan, a Raven album
The Filthy Lucre Tour: Live in Japan, a Sex Pistols album
Shakatak Live in Japan
The Jackson 5 in Japan 
Live in Japan 2002, a Simple Plan album
The Supremes Live! In Japan
Five out of Five (Live in Japan), a Talisman album
Open the Window, Close the Door – Live in Japan, a Thunder album
Live in Japan 1978: Dear John C., an album by jazz drummer Elvin Jones
Elvin Jones Jazz Machine Live in Japan Vol. 2, an album by jazz drummer Elvin Jones

Videos
Live in Japan (Earth, Wind & Fire video)
The Cure Live in Japan
Super Live in Japan, a Queen + Paul Rodgers DVD
We Are the Champions: Final Live in Japan, a Queen video
'89 Live in Japan, a Quiet Riot DVD
Live from Japan, a concert video by Johnny Winter

See also
 At Budokan (disambiguation)